The 2022 Pan American Aerobic Gymnastics Championships was held in Cúcuta, Colombia, from October 26 to 29, 2022. The competition was approved by the International Gymnastics Federation.

Medalists

Senior

References

2022 in gymnastics
International gymnastics competitions hosted by Colombia
2022 in Colombian sport
Pan American Gymnastics Championships
Pan American Aerobic Gymnastics Championships